David Timothy Corbin (August 11, 1833 
– December 8, 1905) was a Reconstruction era lawyer, officer in the Union Army, prisoner of war, U.S. Attorney, state senator, U.S. Senator-elect, and judge in South Carolina. He was from Vermont and came south with the Freedmen's Bureau to Charleston, South Carolina.

As a U.S. attorney in South Carolina he went after the Ku Klux Klan. In 1872 he testified before a joint congressional committee.

He was an unsuccessful candidate for the United States Senate, and was afterwards nominated to be chief justice of the  Utah Territory but not confirmed. He moved to Chicago and practiced law there. He is buried there.

The South Carolina Historical Society has a collection of his papers.

References

1833 births
1905 deaths
American lawyers